Cyclophora sympathica is a moth in the  family Geometridae. It is found in Afghanistan.

References

Moths described in 1883
Cyclophora (moth)
Moths of Asia